Long Line of Heartaches is the thirty-fifth solo studio album by American country artist Connie Smith. It was released August 23, 2011, through Sugar Hill Records and produced by Smith's husband, Marty Stuart. It is her first album of new solo material since 1998, and her second since 1978.

Background 
Long Line of Heartaches was recorded at RCA Victor Records's Studio B, where Smith cut many of her major hit singles for RCA in the 1960s and 70s. The release includes five new songs Smith co-wrote with husband and producer Marty Stuart, and seven written by other country songwriters, including Harlan Howard, Kostas, and Johnny Russell.

The album's official track listing was released in July through Sugar Hill Records.

Track listing

Personnel 

Musicians
 Julie Barnick – background vocals
 Gary Carter – steel guitar
 Ron Ham – background vocals
 Jeanne Hayes – background vocals
 Dirk Johnson – piano
 Paul Martin – bass, vibraphone
 Ric McClure – drums
 Jody Seyfried – background vocals
 Connie Smith – lead vocals
 Marty Stuart – acoustic guitar, electric guitar
 Rick Wright – background vocals, electric guitar, gut string guitar

Technical
 Rob Clark – assistant
 Mick Conley – engineer, mastering, mixing
 Karen Cronin – design
 Marilyn Davis – accounting
 Marc Dottore – management
 Michael Hardesty – assistant
 Russ Harrington – cover photo
 Mat Kraatz – assistant
 Maria Elena Orbean – production coordination
 Thomas Petillo – photography
 Melissa Scheicher – hair stylist, make-up
 Aaron Smith – assistant
 Harry Stinson – videography
 Marty Stuart – producer
 Erick Thompson – assistant
 Stephen Turney – assistant

References 

2011 albums
Albums produced by Marty Stuart
Connie Smith albums
Sugar Hill Records albums